Chris Brunt (born January 1, 1980) is a former American soccer player who played for Kansas City Wizards in the MLS.

Post-playing career
In 2012, Brunt returned to his hometown of Omaha to set up the Evolution Soccer Academy.

Career statistics

Club

Notes

References

1980 births
Living people
Sportspeople from Omaha, Nebraska
Soccer players from Nebraska
Missouri State University alumni
American soccer players
Association football defenders
Missouri State Bears soccer players
Des Moines Menace players
Minnesota Thunder players
Columbus Crew players
Sporting Kansas City players
Charleston Battery players
Major League Soccer players
USL Championship players
Major Indoor Soccer League (2008–2014) players